Dennis Dressel (born 26 October 1998) is a German professional footballer who plays as a midfielder for  club Hansa Rostock.

Career
Dressel made his senior debut for 1860 Munich in the Regionalliga Bayern on 12 May 2018, starting in the away match against SpVgg Bayreuth in which he scored a goal, with the match finishing as a 4–1 win. He made his debut for the club in the 3. Liga on 8 April 2019, starting in the away match against Sonnenhof Großaspach before being substituted out in the 89th minute for Semi Belkahia, with the match finishing as a 1–0 loss.

In the summer of 2022, Dressel signed a two-year contract with Hansa Rostock.

References

External links
 
 

1998 births
Living people
German footballers
Association football midfielders
TSV 1860 Munich II players
TSV 1860 Munich players
FC Hansa Rostock players
3. Liga players
Regionalliga players
2. Bundesliga players